The 1985 NCAA Division I softball tournament was the fourth annual tournament to determine the national champion of NCAA women's collegiate softball. Held during May 1985, sixteen Division I college softball teams contested the championship. The tournament featured eight regionals of two teams with the winner of each region (a total of 8 teams) advancing to the 1985 Women's College World Series at Seymour Smith Park in Omaha, Nebraska. The event held from May 22 through May 26 marked the conclusion of the 1985 NCAA Division I softball season.  UCLA won the championship by defeating  2–1 in the final game. Nebraska's appearance was later vacated due to NCAA infractions.

Regionals

Cal State Fullerton qualifies for WCWS, 2–0

Northwestern qualifies for WCWS, 2–0

Louisiana Tech qualifies for WCWS, 2–1

Utah qualifies for WCWS, 2–1

Nebraska qualifies for WCWS, 2–1
† Nebraska's wins vacated

Adelphi qualifies for WCWS, 2–0

Cal Poly Pomona qualifies for WCWS, 2–0

UCLA qualifies for WCWS, 2–1

Women's College World Series

Participants

UCLA

Game results

Bracket

Game log

Championship Game

All-Tournament Team
The following players were named to the All-Tournament Team

See also
NCAA Division I Softball Championship
Women's College World Series
NCAA Division II Softball Championship
NCAA Division III Softball Championship
College World Series

References

1985 NCAA Division I softball season
NCAA Division I softball tournament